Hazel Alden Reason (April 1901 – 1976) was an English chemist who became a schoolteacher. She was the author of a popular book for young people on the history of chemistry.

Life and works
Hazel Reason was born in Friern Barnet, London. Her father, Will Reason, was a Congregational minister, who campaigned and wrote on aspects of social justice and poverty in books such as The Social Problem for Christian Citizens (1913), Homes and Housing (1919), and Drink and the Community (1920). Both her parents were university graduates.

Reason was educated at Milton Mount College For Girls in Gravesend. She graduated from Bedford College in 1924 with a BSc in Chemistry, and then obtained a position as a senior science mistress at the County School for Girls, Guildford. In her spare time there, she studied for an MSc (London) on the History of Science, which she completed in 1936. She was elected a Chemical Society Fellow in the same year.

Hazel Reason remained unmarried. She lived in Guildford with her sister, the writer Joyce Reason, for much of her life.

History of science
Hazel Reason's book on the history of science, The Road to Modern Science, was published in 1936. A second edition appeared in 1940 and a third, revised edition in 1950.

Reason commented in the Foreword that her object was to present the story of scientific discovery in a form that would appeal to intelligent boys and girls. She did not approve of the "great scientist approach", preferring that her book should cover "the broad view of scientific discovery."

References

Schoolteachers from Surrey
1901 births
1976 deaths
British women chemists
British chemists
Alumni of Bedford College, London
20th-century British women scientists